Alan Klingenstein (born 1954) is a corporate and securities attorney, investment banker, film distributor, and award-winning film producer. His feature film Two Family House won the Audience Award at the 2000 Sundance Film Festival. Another feature film, Runaway, premiered at the Tribeca Film Festival, the Toronto International Film Festival, and won Best Dramatic Feature at the 2005 Austin Film Festival. His documentary Trumbo was awarded the  National Board of Review's Freedom of Expression Award in 2008. Klingenstein is currently the Chairman of FilmRise, a film and television distribution company.

Early life
Klingenstein was born and raised in Scarsdale, New York. He is Jewish. His father is Lee P. Klingenstein, a noted philanthropist and partner in the New York investment management firm of Neuberger Berman. Klingenstein graduated from the Taft School. He then earned a bachelor's degree at Princeton, and a law degree and MBA from Cornell University.

He was a corporate and securities attorney with the firm of McCutcheon, Doyle, Brown & Enerson, then traveled through Asia as General Counsel and VP for Shakey's International. Later he worked as a VP of Bankers Trust Securities in London.

Film production and distribution
In 1996, after twelve years in the corporate world, Klingenstein produced his first film: the documentary The Church of Saint Coltrane with Jeff Swimmer. Shortly after, Klingenstein formed Filbert Steps Productions, together with media investor and production partner Jim Kohlberg. Klingenstein produced Filberts Steps' films for very low budgets: Two Family House (2000), Forever Fabulous, Runaway, and Trumbo (2008)

Klingenstein developed Filmcatcher.com, containing editorial coverage of art house films, on-camera interviews with filmmakers and actors, film festival coverage, critical reviews, celebrity picks, and profiles of the independent film community.

In 2010, Klingenstein joined with brothers Danny and Jack Fisher to create FilmRise, a film acquisition fund and distribution company established to acquire and distribute a slate of both mainstream and specialized films, documentaries, and television series.

OC 87 was released by FilmRise in June 2012. It depicts how Bradford (Buddy) Clayman, a middle-aged man who suffered an obsessive-compulsive disorder for over 20 years, was finally able to enter a path of recovery. The New York Times called it "a moving, penetrating documentary".

References

External links

Princeton University alumni
Cornell Law School alumni
Sundance Film Festival award winners
Film producers from New York (state)
American lawyers
Living people
Samuel Curtis Johnson Graduate School of Management alumni
People from Scarsdale, New York
1954 births
Taft School alumni